Kevin Loforte (born 27 February 1997) is a Mozambican judoka. He competed in the 2020 Summer Olympics.

At the 2021 African Judo Championships held in Dakar, Senegal, he won one of the bronze medals in the men's 66 kg event.

References

External links
 

1997 births
Living people
Sportspeople from Maputo
Judoka at the 2020 Summer Olympics
Mozambican male judoka
Olympic judoka of Mozambique
African Games competitors for Mozambique
Competitors at the 2019 African Games